The Natural History Museum is a museum in Paranesti, Greece, which has been operating since October 2002 and has an exhibition space exceeding 300 sq. m., in which the presentation of the exhibits is done in the most modern way, providing rich information about the geology, the rocks, the fossils and the wealth flora and fauna of Rhodope region and the valley of Nestos.

Gallery

References

External links
 Museums in Paranesti official website

Museums in Eastern Macedonia and Thrace
Natural history museums in Greece
Buildings and structures in Drama (regional unit)